Ben Reid is a member of the board of directors of International Cooperative Alliance and former CEO of Midcounties Co-operative.

Career
He began his career as an employee in a small co-operative in Ilkeston. He moved to Walsall in 1988, when he was appointed deputy chief executive of West Midlands Co-op. He became chief executive in 1992. In 2005 West Midlands merged with the Oxford, Swindon and Gloucester Society to become Midcounties Cooperative.

Under his leadership Midcounties Co-operative grew into the UK’s largest independent co-operative and moved also to childcare, travel, health and energy. Under his leadership Midcounties Co-operative became an early champion of the Fair Tax Mark and also served as the chair of Cooperatives UK.

In 2018, Reid was appointed Chair of Shrewsbury and Telford Hospital NHS Trust, and in 2019 Chair of the University of Wolverhampton.

References

English businesspeople in retailing
Living people
Year of birth missing (living people)